Hsin Pei (born March 13, 1970) is a Taiwanese Buddhist monk and elder of the Fo Guang Shan order. He served two terms as abbot and director of the order from 2007 to 2013. The youngest abbot ever elected to the order, Hsin Pei was elected by the members of Fo Guang Shan worldwide in 2004 and succeeded retiring abbot Hsin Ting in 2005. His term ended in March 2013 and was succeeded by Hsin Bau, the former abbot of Hsi Lai Temple.

References 

1970 births
Living people
People from Penghu County
Taiwanese Buddhist monks
Taiwanese religious leaders
Taiwanese Zen Buddhists
Rinzai Buddhists
Fo Guang Shan Buddhists